Elections to the Baseball Hall of Fame for 1958 followed a system established after the 1956 election. The Baseball Writers' Association of America (BBWAA) voted by mail to select from recent major league players; they elected no one. The BBWAA was voting only in even-number years, with the Veterans Committee meeting only in odd-numbered years to consider older major league players as well as managers, umpires, and executives. For the first time since , the induction ceremonies in Cooperstown, New York, were canceled because there was no one to induct, the second such occurrence in Hall of Fame history.

BBWAA election
Several elements of the current procedure were put into effect. There was a printed list of eligible candidates, all of whom had played in at least ten major league seasons. Only 10-year members of the BBWAA were eligible to vote, and they were instructed to vote for up to ten candidates rather than ten. The latter revision resulted from complaints by many writers in 1956 that there were no longer many viable candidates, a situation which had been caused partly by changes governing candidate eligibility.

The BBWAA was authorized to elect players active in 1928 or later but not after 1952, a 25-year span of major league finales. (In a change, they were permitted to be active in non-playing roles.) The Hall of Fame would induct any candidate who received at least 75% support, as always, which was 200 votes on 266 ballots returned. A total of 2,400 individual votes were cast, an average of 9.02 per ballot.

There were about 400 players on the new ballot and about 154 received at least one vote. A dagger (†) marks candidates who last played in 1951 or 1952. Under the new rules they would have been on the ballot for the first time, alone among the candidates who received votes, but this was the first ballot with a list of players. Candidates who have been inducted subsequently are named in italics.

With many strong candidates but none who particularly stood out, many players received support but none were elected; while 27 players received between 10% and 40%, only two received more than 40%. Max Carey's 51.1% remains the lowest percentage for a top vote getter in a BBWAA election.

Notes

References

External links
1958 Hall of Fame Voting, Baseball Reference. Confirmed 2010-09-12.
BBWAA Results by Year: 1958, National Baseball Hall of Fame and Museum. Confirmed 2010-09-12. — The list is truncated at George Case, the sixth of 41 candidates who received one vote.
Bill Deane, "Award and Honors: Hall of Fame Elections: History", in every edition of Total Baseball edited by John Thorn and Pete Palmer. Third edition, 1993, New York: HarperCollins, pages 297–309.

Baseball Hall of Fame balloting
Hall of Fame balloting